Ormiston Trust is a charitable trust based in London, England. It is a grant-making trust that chiefly assists schools and organisations supporting children and young people.

The trust was established in the memory of Fiona Ormiston Murray who died in a car crash with her husband on their honeymoon in 1969.

Much of the trust's work is accomplished through its two main subsidiaries - Ormiston Families and Ormiston Academies Trust.

Ormiston Families
Ormiston Families (formerly Ormiston Children and Families Trust) is a charitable company limited by guarantee that has some financial support from Ormiston Trust. It delivers a range of child and family centred programmes across the East of England including support for those affected by the imprisonment of a family member, services for new mothers and mothers to be, as well as mental health and wellbeing support services for children and young people.

Prison Visitor Centres
Ormiston Families operates Prison Visitor Centres in the following prisons:

HM Prison Bure
HM Prison Chelmsford
HM Prison Littlehey
HM Prison Norwich
HM Prison Wayland
HM Prison Highpoint
HM Prison Norwich
HM Prison Hollesley Bay
HM Prison Whitemoor
HM Prison Warren Hill

Ormiston Academies Trust
Ormiston Academies Trust (OAT) is a charity and incorporated company which operates schools with academy status.

Secondary schools
In total, there are 32 secondary schools operated by Ormiston Academies Trust. 8 in the North, 10 in the East, 5 in the South and 9 in the West.

Ormiston Bolingbroke Academy, Runcorn (N)
Broadland High Ormiston Academy, Hoveton (E)
Brownhills Ormiston Academy, Walsall (W)
Ormiston Bushfield Academy, Peterborough (S)
Ormiston Chadwick Academy, Widnes (N)
City of Norwich School, An Ormiston Academy, Norwich (E)
Cliff Park Ormiston Academy, Gorleston (E)
Cowes Enterprise College, An Ormiston Academy, Cowes (S)
Ormiston Denes Academy, Lowestoft (E)
Ormiston Endeavour Academy, Ipswich (S)
Flegg High Ormiston Academy, Martham (E)
Ormiston Forge Academy, Cradley Heath (W)
George Salter Academy, West Bromwich (W)
Ormiston Horizon Academy, Stoke-on-Trent (N)
Ormiston Ilkeston Enterprise Academy, Ilkeston (N)
Ormiston Maritime Academy, Grimsby (N)
Ormiston Meridian Academy, Stoke-on-Trent (N)
Ormiston NEW Academy, Fordhouses (W)
Ormiston Park Academy, South Ockendon (S)
Ormiston Rivers Academy, Burnham-on-Crouch (S)
Ormiston Sandwell Community Academy, Tividale (W)
Sandymoor Ormiston Academy, Runcorn, (N)
Ormiston Shelfield Community Academy, Pelsall (W)
Ormiston Sir Stanley Matthews Academy, Stoke-on-Trent (N)
Ormiston Six Villages Academy, Chichester (S)
Stoke High School – Ormiston Academy, Ipswich (S)
Ormiston Sudbury Academy, Sudbury (S)
Ormiston SWB Academy, Wolverhampton (W)
Tenbury High Ormiston Academy, Tenbury Wells (W)
Ormiston Venture Academy, Gorleston (E)
Ormiston Victory Academy, Costessey (E)
Wodensborough Ormiston Academy, Wednesbury (W)

Primary schools
In total, there are 6 primary schools operated by Ormiston Academies Trust. 2 in the North, 3 in the East and 1 in the South.
Ormiston Cliff Park Primary Academy, Gorleston (E)
Edward Worlledge Ormiston Academy, Great Yarmouth (E)
Ormiston Herman Academy, Great Yarmouth (E)
Ormiston Meadows Academy, Peterborough (S)
Packmoor Ormiston Academy, Stoke-on-Trent (N)
Ormiston South Parade Academy, Grimsby (N)

Alternative Provision and Special schools
In total, there are 5 schools operated by Ormiston Academies Trust, in OAT's Alternative Provision and Special group.
Ormiston Beachcroft Academy, London
Ormiston Bridge Academy, London
Ormiston Courtyard Academy, London
Ormiston Latimer Academy, London
Thomas Wolsey Ormiston Academy, Ipswich

See also
List of charitable foundations

References

External links
 Ormiston Trust website
 Ormiston Families website
 Ormiston Academies Trust website

Educational charities based in the United Kingdom
Charities based in London